Rub-A-Dub-Dub was a British television series animated by Peter Lang and Alan Rogers of the Cut-Out Animation Co. They were previously famous for Pigeon Street. The series was produced by David Yates and Joe Wolf. The title is a reference to the nursery rhyme Rub-a-dub-dub.
Rub-A-Dub-Dub was animated in a similar way, yet all the characters were anthropomorphic animals. It ran in 1984, completing 25 episodes.

Episode structure
The episodes usually started off with the character Mother Goose and (most often) another character stood by a polka-dot patterned bathtub, with Mother Goose saying "Rub-a-dub-dub..." announcing that there was an item in the tub, an item that will then be relevant to the episode, e.g. "Rub-a-dub-dub, there's a kettle in the tub..." The line would then usually be followed up by another. In this case, the character King Crow appears at the window and says "...And King Crow wants his tea!"
The nursery rhymes themselves would be dotted in amongst the humorous dialogue between the animal characters.

Characters

Principal characters
Mother Goose: Could be considered the hostess of Rub-A-Dub-Dub. She begins every episode by saying "Rub-a-dub-dub, there's a... in the tub." She is a white goose, wearing what looks to be a yellow raincoat and hat, a blue skirt beneath the coat and blue shoes. She also wears pink tights with white spots.
Polly: An irritable parrot. She often gets annoyed with various characters, such as with Mother Goose when she asks her to make King Crow's tea. In this instance, she responds "I'm not gonna make it! Why does it always have to be me!? Humph!" She also often appears to be on the receiving end of bad luck, such as when she sets her dinner down before the television, leaves to get a drink, and then finds her dinner has been stolen, to which she responds: "EH! Where did it go?!" Polly had a red face and blue hands and legs, wore a green jumper with red sleeves and yellow shoes.
King Crow: The King who is a crow. He was awfully demanding of his servants such as Polly, on whom he intrudes into her TV-watching time, saying "Hello Polly, get me my pipe and bowl please!" He was also awfully energetic and bounced around a lot. Like all crows, King Crow was black with a yellow beak. He wore a stereotypical King's robe and crown, black and white striped stockings and black-and-white shoes.
Queen Duck: The wife of King Crow.
Al E. Gator: An alligator who was somewhat of an antagonist on the show. He was always causing trouble, such as tripping over Baa Sheep and causing him to fall in mud, or interrupting Polly's favourite TV show as "Tonight's Special Guest". He wore a red coat and a top hat. In one episode, he lost his violin bow. He does have his good points though, as he helped nurse Yankee Doodle back to health when the latter knocked himself out after doing his morning exercises.
Baa Sheep: A white sheep who wore red shoes. He once fell victim to Al E. Gator's mischief, when he tripped him over and caused him to fall into a muddy puddle. This dirtied his wool and left him displeased. He sang I do not like thee, Doctor Fell to him. Al E Gator simply laughed and asked "What did I do wrong?" before leaving. Baa was also close to Mother Goose, who cleaned him up in the eponymous tub after this incident.
Buzz Tiger: A tiger with melissophobia (fear of bees). He seemed to be romantically involved with Mary the giraffe.
Brian Lion: A lion who was good friends with Buzz and Blue.
Olga Ostrich: An ostrich who wore pink shoes. She once lost one of these shoes in one episode. She was also sat at the same restaurant as Polly when she had her dinner stolen.
The Penguin Trio: Three traveling penguins, who served as soldiers and musicians for King Crow as well as inattentive waiters at the restaurant.
Jack and Jill: Two twin pigs. They both wore blue and yellow tops and red shoes. Jack wore a yellow striped red hat and the Jill had blonde hair with two plaits with red bows. Jack was more heavily featured than his sister, although in Jack and Jill, Mrs. Mason's Basin and Jack Sprat they were featured together. They were Elsie Pig's children and had a baby sibling.
Elsie Pig: The mother of Jack and Jill and an unnamed baby. She wore a yellow and black dress and matching hat. She appeared to be a cleaner in the castle like Mother Goose.
Blue: A blue hippopotamus who wore a yellow raincoat and rain hat, similar to Mother Goose. He was featured on Polly's favorite Western TV show. He was due to face off in a duel with Yankee Doodle, before they were interrupted by Al E. Gator. He also appeared as Santa Claus in one episode.
Yankee Doodle: A white rooster married to Mrs. Doodle. He was often seen jogging and weightlifting. He was featured on Polly's favorite Western TV show. He was due to face off in a duel with Blue the hippo, before being interrupted by Al E. Gator.
Mrs. Doodle: A brown hen who was married to Yankee Doodle.
Tom Cat: A young cat who went to London to see the Queen. The Queen Duck asked him to catch one of the mice in the castle, but ended up knocking all of the furniture over and was sent away. He was often depicted as a troublemaker who enjoyed stealing others' food.
Yellow Dog: A yellow dog who wears a blue sweater and often liked to make jokes. 
Mice: Three mice that were often in some nursery rhymes, one dressed as a Chef, one as a Butcher, and one in a yellow top with red, green and blue stars.
Mary Giraffe: A giraffe who wore a blue sweatshirt with a giraffe number 11 and a pink skirt with pink shoes. She often appeared to be romantically involved with Buzz the Tiger.
Barney Owl: An owl who wore a purple coat and hat and glasses. He was married to an unnamed female owl, who was often seen with Queen Duck.
Roland Turtle: A green turtle who wore brown shoes and glasses with yellow edges. He had the ability to attach wheels to the bottom of his shell, as well as roller skates, use his shell as a boat and also travel by balloon.
Quincy the Spider: A spider who wore green, red and yellow roller skates.
Pat Cat: An orange, bespectacled cat who played the role of the teacher in Mary Had a Little Lamb.
Melody Moo: a red cow who appeared to be a bit of a performer, often seen singing at the Palm Court restaurant.
Ned the Horse: A white horse who wore red shoes. He is a bit of a troublemaker and does not speak at all. One time, he took King Crow's crown for being called a unicorn when he wore a candle on his head.

Episodes
01. Mary Mary
02. Jack and Jill
03. A Wise Old Owl
04. Tom Tom the Piper's Son
05. Baa Baa Black Sheep
06. Incy Wincey Spider
07. The House That Jack Built
08. Old King Cole
09. Hey Diddle Diddle
10. Star Light, Star Bright
11. Here We Go Round the Mulberry Bush
12. Yankee Doodle
13. The Grand Old Duke of York
14. I Had a Cat
15. To Market, To Market
16. Three Men in a Tub
17. There Was an Old Woman
18. Christmas Comes
19. Little Bo Peep
20. Little Poll Parrot
21. It's Raining, It's Pouring
22. The Lion and the Unicorn
23. Pussy Cat, Pussy Cat
24. Poor Old Robinson Crusoe
25. One for the Money

Release
It was directed by Lee Bernhardi. It ran on Children's ITV from 17 October 1984 until 20 November 1984 and it also ran on The Disney Channel in the 80s in the United States, Saudi 2 in Saudi Arabia and Knowledge Network in Canada. The series was later distributed on VHS in two separate volumes in North America twice, both by Hi-Tops Video under its original titles 'Rub-a-Dub-Dub' Volume 1 & 2 in 1986–87, and re-released in 1989 under the titles 'Musical Mother Goose' and 'More Musical Mother Goose' respectively. The series was also released on VHS in the UK market by Thames Video under the title 'The Ultimate Nursery Rhymes Video' on 10 February 1992,  which has since not been distributed.

References
Episode guide at Locate TV, Accessed Jan 2011

1980s British animated television series
1984 British television series debuts
1984 British television series endings
1980s British children's television series
ITV children's television shows
Television series by Fremantle (company)
Television series by ITV Studios
English-language television shows
Animated television series about birds
Animated television series about cats
Television series about chickens
Television series about cattle
Animated television series about dogs
Animated television series about horses
Animated television series about lions
Animated television series about mice and rats
Animated television series about penguins
Animated television series about pigs
Television series about sheep
Television series about spiders
Television series about tigers
Animated television series about turtles